Hoàng Minh Chính (November 16, 1922 – February 7, 2008), also Trần Ngọc Nghiêm, was a Vietnamese politician and dissident. He was one of the best-known figures and ideologists of the Vietnamese Communist Party during the 1960s and held several key governmental positions. In the late 1960s, he criticized decisions made by his own party and was sent to jail three times.

Early life
Hoang was born in 1922 in the province of Nam Dinh and joined the communist revolution in 1937. He was later trained in politics in the Soviet Union during the late 1950s.

Political career
From 1960 to 1967, he was named during his political tenure in various key positions inside the government including vice-minister of education and director of the Marxist Institute of Philosophy.

He was opposed to any military action against the southern half of Vietnam during the Vietnam War and called for more democratic procedures within the ranks of the party. He would later become a member and the secretary general of the Democratic Party of Vietnam until it was dissolved in 1986 (together with Socialist Party, the other legal 'non-communist' party in Vietnam).

In 1967, Hoang wrote a 200-page document criticizing the policies made by the Communist Party and was jailed twice for a total of eleven years and was under house arrest until 1990. However, he criticized once more of his party and he was jailed for a third time in 1995 and remained under house arrest until his death. Despite constant government surveillance and his house arrest, he would continue to be involved in pro-democracy movements during the late 1990s.

In June 2006, he reactivated the Democratic Party of Vietnam.

Later life
In 2005, he began to experience health problems. In a surprise move from the government, he was allowed to go to the United States to receive treatment for pancreatic cancer and was able to return to Vietnam despite opposition from the media after he made a speech in Congressional Committee at the United States House of Representatives on the situation in Vietnam and his criticism of the country repression on pro-democracy activists and its human rights record. After his return to Vietnam, there were reports that groups of plain-clothed police attacked him at his home. Briefly he returned as a member of the DPV.

Death
He died at his home in Hanoi on February 7, 2008, aged 85, on the first day of the Tet Lunar New Year.

References

1922 births
2008 deaths
Deaths from pancreatic cancer
Vietnamese dissidents
Deaths from cancer in Vietnam
Communist Party of Vietnam politicians
Democratic Party of Vietnam politicians